Power most often refers to:
 Power (physics), meaning "rate of doing work"
 Engine power, the power put out by an engine
 Electric power
 Power (social and political), the ability to influence people or events
 Abusive power

Power may also refer to:

Mathematics, science and technology

Computing
 IBM POWER (software), an IBM operating system enhancement package
 IBM POWER architecture, a RISC instruction set architecture
 Power ISA, a RISC instruction set architecture derived from PowerPC
 IBM Power microprocessors, made by IBM, which implement those RISC architectures
 Power.org, a predecessor to the OpenPOWER Foundation
 SGI POWER Challenge, a line of SGI supercomputers

Mathematics
 Exponentiation, "x to the power of y"
 Power function
 Power of a point
 Statistical power

Physics
 Magnification, the factor by which an optical system enlarges an image
 Optical power, the degree to which a lens converges or diverges light

Social sciences and politics
 Economic power, encompassing several concepts that economists use, featuring the word "power"
 Power (international relations), the ability to influence states

Arts, entertainment, and media

Fictional entities
 Power Girl, a fictional character in the DC Comics universe
 Power Pack, a fictional Marvel Comics superhero-team consisting of four young siblings

Films
 Power (1928 film), a comedy film starring William Boyd, Alan Hale and Jacqueline Logan
 Power (1986 film), an American drama film
 Power (2014 Telugu film), a Telugu film starring Ravi Teja and Hansika Motwani
 Power (2014 Kannada film), a Kannada film starring Puneeth Rajkumar and Trisha
 Power (2016 film), a Bengali action comedy film

Literature
 Power (Fast novel), a 1962 novel by Howard Fast
 Power (play), a 2003 play by Nick Dear
 Power: A New Social Analysis, a 1938 sociology book by Bertrand Russell

Music

Albums
 Power (Alex Newell EP), 2016
 Power (Barrabás album), 1973
 Power (Boys Noize album), 2009
 Power (Ice-T album), 1988
 Power (Kansas album), 1986
 Power (Nekrogoblikon EP), 2013
 Power (Q and Not U album), 2004
 Power (Tower of Power album), 1987
 Power (B.A.P single album), 2012
 Power, by Group 1 Crew
 Power, by Lakeside
 Power, by SSD
 Power, by The Temptations
 Power, by Z-Ro

Songs
"Power" (Diljá song), 2023
"Power" (Ellie Goulding song), 2020
"Power" (Exo song), 2017
 "Power" (Little Mix Song), 2016
 "Power" (Kanye West song), 2010
 "Power" (Helloween song), 1996
 "Power" (KMFDM song), 1996
 "Power" (Sharon O'Neill song), 1984
 "Power", by Hardwell and Kshmr 
 "Power", by Bastille from Wild World
 "Power", by John and Johanna Hall
 "Power", by Kansas from Power
 "Power", by Katy Perry from Witness
 "Power", by Leona Lewis from I Am
 "Power", by Lipps Inc. from Mouth to Mouth
 "Power", by Rainbow from Straight Between the Eyes
 "Power", by Ufo361 and Capital Bra from 808, 2018
 "Power", by Tears For Fears from Elemental

Radio
 Power 98 (radio station), an English-language radio station in Singapore
 The Power (XM), an XM satellite radio channel
 Power 105.1, a radio station in New York City

Television
 Power (TV series), a 2014 drama series on Starz about a New York City illegal drug network
 Power Universe, an American media franchise comprising Power and its spin-offs.
 "Power" (Batwoman), an episode of Batwoman
 "Power" (Smallville), an episode of Smallville

Other uses in arts, entertainment, and media
 Girl Got Game, originally Power!!, a manga series 1999–2002
 Power Magazine, a Swedish automobile magazine
 Power!, a 1985 video game
Power, a character from the anime and manga series Chainsaw Man

People
 Power (name), including a list of people and fictional characters with the surname
 Phil Taylor (darts player) (born 1960), English darts champion nicknamed "The Power"
 Oliver "Power" Grant, American producer, streetwear clothing mogul and actor
 Power Twins (disambiguation), several uses

Places
 Power (UTA station), a light rail station in Salt Lake City, United States
 Power, Montana, a census-designated place in the U.S.
 Power, West Virginia, an unincorporated community in the U.S.
 Power County, Idaho, also in the U.S.

Sports
 Power (basketball), the 3-on-3 basketball team that plays in the BIG3
 Power (horse), a British thoroughbred
 Pittsburgh Power, an Arena Football League
 Port Adelaide Football Club, nicknamed "Power", an Australian rules football club
 Power F.C., a professional football club based in Koforidua, Ghana
 West Virginia Power, a minor league baseball team

Other uses
 Power (angel), a rank in the Christian angelic hierarchy
 Power, an alternative name for the psychedelic drug 2C-P

See also

 
 
 The Power (disambiguation)
 J.D. Power and Associates, a global marketing information services firm
 POW-R, a set of commercial dithering and noise shaping algorithms
 Powers (disambiguation)
 Strength (disambiguation)